Cheilosia psilophthalma is a Palearctic hoverfly  closely related  and very similar to  Cheilosia latigenis, Cheilosia mutabilis and Cheilosia urbana .
It is a rare and little known species recorded from Scandinavia, Ireland, Britain, France, Poland, Switzerland, Greece, Montenegro, Serbia, Ukraine and European Russia. Flowers visited include Acer platanoides,  Anemone nemorosa, Primula veris, Prunus spinosa and  Salix spp. Cheilosia psilophthalma   flies in April and May (July at higher altitudes). Open, grassy areas within sparse woodland and unimproved, montane subalpine grassland are preferred habitats. Larvae are recorded as developing in Hieracium pilosella and Hieracium caespitosum.

References

External links
 External images

Diptera of Europe
Eristalinae
Insects described in 1894